The official , used from the Meiji period until the end of the Second World War, consisted of European-inspired clothing of the 1870's. It was first introduced at the beginning of the Meiji period and maintained through the institution of the constitutional monarchy by the Meiji Constitution, and represented the highest uniforms in use at the time. Uniforms for members of the  peerage and civil officials were officially set.

History 

When the Meiji Restoration began, those working to build the new government were wearing a diverse array of different clothing based on their social status during the previous Edo period. Nobles had their  court wear and informal , samurai had the distinct  and  dress, and members of Westernized military forces had their Western-style uniforms. For example, during the Emperor's visit to Tokyo in 1868, opinions were divided between the high officials Nakayama Tadayasu and Date Munenari. As a result, it was decided that both  and  would be allowed en route, with  also permitted when entering the castle. Meanwhile, the soldiers guarding it were dressed in Western-style uniforms, but were not at all accustomed to the clothing. Ernest Satow commented that their slovenly appearances ruined the solemnity of the procession. This lack of uniformity was once again evident on the Emperor's repeat visit the next year.

The situation was clearly untenable, and so after the election of officials to the new government in summer 1869, the Minister of Justice Saga Saneharu was put in charge of the problem. In a meeting of the legislature that winter, Iwakura Tomomi proposed deliberation over the court dress for governmental officials that Saga and his helpers had come up with. However, as this design was based on the former dress of court nobles, it met with opposition from those of samurai descent. In order to quiet the  still attached to traditional styles of dress, the order claimed that  and similar kinds of clothing were weak, and Japan should go back to the styles of the time of Emperor Jimmu and Empress Jingū. The "styles of that time" meant tight sleeves and narrow , and so the order implied that Western-style dress, complying to these standards, had much in common with the essential garb of the Japanese themselves. Calling back to the spirit of Jimmu's legendary founding of the country, it appealed for the creation of a new uniform.

On December 12, 1872, the Dajō-kan released an edict implementing regulations for the uniforms of civil officials and nobles, and on December 29 of that year another edict determined regulations for their wearing. The new official uniforms were indeed designed based on the court uniforms used in Europe at the time. The first of these edicts also designated white tie dress as the court dress of choice for those not entitled to any particular court uniform, such as private citizens.

The uniforms for members of the Imperial Family were first decided by an edict of the Dajō-kan on February 22, 1873, and then updated in 1876 and 1911.

After the Peerage Act of July 7, 1884, divided the existing  into five ranks, the Ministry of the Imperial Household further established the uniforms for these new subcategories. On October 29 of the same year, another edict of the Dajō-kan created gown-type court uniforms for senior officials within palace agencies like the Board of Chamberlains and Board of Ceremonies. From 1888 to 1889, various other personnel were outfitted with uniforms and assigned court uniforms. The Imperial Household Agency's uniforms underwent major changes in 1911 and 1928.

On June 23, 1886, provisions were set to determine formal Western wear for women. In order from most to least formal, these were the manteau de cour, robe décolletée, robe mi-décolletée, and robe montante.

On December 4 of the same year, the designs of the court uniforms for civil officials were modified, but the designs for junior officials were not updated. Because the officials were responsible for providing their own court uniforms, the cost had been too much for junior officials. From this point on, junior civil officials wore standard white tie court dress. The difference in price was extreme: when the official Kikuchi Takeo ordered both a three-piece suit and his court uniform at the same shop, the suit cost 28 yen and the uniform 220 yen.

On March 2, 1908, an Imperial edict established substitute court uniforms for diplomats dispatched to the tropics or very hot areas. Later, on September 29, 1926, another Imperial edict established alternative court uniforms and court dress for Japanese officials in the South Pacific. All of these consisted of white tunics. Old news footage shows officials of the South Seas Mandate, including Kōki Hirota, in these clothes.

Although their names differed, naval and military officers also had dress corresponding to court uniforms. Unlike civil officials, military officials were allowed to wear their uniforms to personal ceremonies such as marriages and funerals.

These various kinds of court uniforms continued to be used at court functions and ceremonies even into the Shōwa period, at events like the Imperial enthronement and the first visit of Emperor of Manchukuo Puyi to Japan. However, as the strain of war continued, opportunities for their use became rarer and rarer. When Mitsumasa Yonai became Prime Minister during the Second Sino-Japanese War, his morning dress could not be tailored in time for the appointment, and he wore a naval uniform in its place at his official investiture.

After the war, Imperial Household Agency edicts and the pertinent Dajō-kan edicts were abolished, on May 2, 1947, and July 1, 1954, respectively. The Empire of Japan's court uniforms disappeared with them, but similar male uniforms do remain in use around the world, including in France, various South American countries, and Thailand.

Court uniforms for civil officials 

These uniforms were officially decided by edict of the Dajō-kan on December 12, 1872. The Iwakura Mission, which had departed Japan earlier, also gathered information on uniform design via Hayashi Tadasu. However, the mission had no time to wait for a final decision before an audience with Queen Victoria. They therefore ordered uniforms in England, based on the designs they had been discussing with the homeland. Unfortunately, the designs they reported back were determined to be impossible to create in Japan's still-immature Western clothing stores and were not adopted directly. The versions ultimately decreed by the Dajō-kan differed considerably from the Iwakura mission's prototypes. The Dajō-kan's edicts were still incomplete as a form of law, and the details of the original edict itself were in some areas insufficient, so variations were visible depending on the manufacturer.

There were also problems with the uniforms themselves. This issue was even pointed out by Otto von Bismarck when the Iwakura mission visited Germany. On September 18, 1877, an edict of the Dajō-kan brought these pants into line with the coats, changing them to the same black wool material.

Aiming to set clear and unified standards for the uniforms, the regulations were amended on December 4, 1886, by an order of the Ministry of the Imperial Household. Pictures and diagrams were published in an official telegram, and related manufacturers were provided with sample illustrations printed in color.

The amendment was targeted at the uniforms for senior officials. Those of junior officials were not addressed and instead died out. Correspondence between the Cabinet's chief clerk Kawasaki Takashi and Under-Secretary of the Army Hajime Sugiyama suggests that further modifications to civil officials' uniforms were being considered at the time of the 1928 changes to the uniforms of the Imperial Household Agency.

Court uniforms to the 1872 Dajō-kan standard

Court uniforms of the Iwakura Mission

Composition 
 Hat
 Coat
 A frock coat of black wool.
 Vest
 Trousers

Ornamentation 
 Ornamented areas
 Rank indication
 Embroidered in the ornamented areas of both sleeves. Each line was one  (about ) across, and the space between lines was eight  (about ).
 Buttons
  wore gold-coated buttons inlaid with a 5-7-5 leaf paulownia flower,  gold-coated buttons with a 3-5-3 leaf paulownia, and  silver-coated buttons with a 3-5-3 leaf paulownia.

Uniforms for lower officials 
Civil officials below the  level used standard white-tie court dress. However, the higher-ranking among these affixed symbols of their ranks to each cuff.

After the 1886 revision

Court uniforms for court ranks 

The court uniforms for people possessing court ranks, but no official position, were decided along with those for civil officials in the December 12, 1872, edict of the Dajō-kan. After the establishment of the five ranks (duke, baron, etc.) within the  peerage, however, heads of titled households wore uniforms specific to their titles. Specifically, the junior first rank was to correspond to the title of duke, the senior second rank to a marquis, the junior second rank to a count, the senior third rank to a viscount, and the senior fourth rank to a baron.

In the 1872 version, the hat plumage was black even for those above the fourth rank, and the stripes on the trousers were composed of embroidered lines of five  (about ) across in a  pattern, while people of the fifth rank and below had single stripes of the same width. An edict of the Dajō-kan on October 8, 1877, added black wool trousers, and a May 27, 1911, Imperial Household ordinance changed the hat plumage for those of fourth rank or above to white.

The Emperor's Western clothes 

The continuing Westernization of the Emperor's clothing, food, and living conditions after the Meiji Restoration led to the need for Western , or Imperial garb. This was prepared in 1872, and resembled the court uniforms for civil officials. At the time, the Emperor still had a topknot, and so his hat was designed to contain it.

However, the foreign government advisor  advised that the emperor of France wore a military general's uniform, rather than that of a civil official. The 1880 edict was replaced on November 14, 1913, by an Imperial Household ordinance. Along with a redesign of the army uniform-based outfit, a version based on naval uniform was also introduced. After this, the army- and navy-style uniforms were redefined and the corresponding ordinance modified whenever the base army and navy uniforms were themselves updated.

When Japan lost the Second World War and the Imperial Japanese Army was dissolved in 1945, a new Imperial uniform was established. However, this new uniform was abolished on May 2, 1947, along with all other Imperial Household Edicts.

Court uniforms for the Imperial Family 
When the court uniforms for the Imperial Family were first established on February 22, 1873, the designs were more or less the same as those for court ranks, but with the paulownia crests replaced with the chrysanthemum seal. This made the Imperial Family's uniforms difficult to distinguish from those for court ranks, and so on October 12, 1876, they were updated with chrysanthemum foliage scrollwork.

In 1911, the Imperial Household Ordinance on Imperial Family Dress was promulgated, and an additional clause in it abolished the pertinent Dajō-kan edicts of 1873 and 1876. This order defined two levels of formal dress, changed the chrysanthemum foliage scrollwork to use a sakura motif instead, and specified fully closed mandarin collars. However, as Imperial Family members were now supposed to wear the uniforms of their offices if they held any, and most princes were appointed as officers in the military or navy unless there was a reason not to, most wore military uniforms, and these new uniforms for the Imperial Family saw little actual use.

Court uniforms for the  

After the Peerage Act of July 7, 1884, divided the existing  into five ranks, uniforms were established for these ranks by the Ministry of the Imperial Household on October 25 of the same year.

Composition 
Compared to the uniforms for civil officials, those for  lacked embroidery on the breast, but had a mandarin collar and epaulets.

Identifying the five ranks
Dukes had purple, marquis scarlet, counts pink, viscounts pale yellow, and barons light green.
 Hat
 A black bicorne hat with white ostrich feather plumage.
 Coat
 A black tailcoat with a mandarin collar. Epaulets on the shoulders.
 Vest
 Either white wool or black wool. White wool was used on especially formal occasions.
 Trousers
 Either white wool or black wool. White wool was used on especially formal occasions. With one stripe on the side one  (about ) wide, in gold thread.
 Buttons
 5-7-5 leaf paulownia flower on gold background.
 Sword
 2 , 3 , and 5  (about ) long.

Uniforms for palace officials 

In 1886, the Imperial Guard were assigned both regular and court uniforms, and in 1888 the rest of the institutions of the Ministry of the Imperial Household were allocated their own. These various regulations were unified in a 1911 revision, and major changes were made in 1928.

1884 designs 
These gown-like designs were based on Prussian court clothing, and were supposedly proposed by Yamagata Aritomo.

1886 designs 
The June 26, 1886, edict 9 of the Ministry of the Imperial Household established regular and court uniforms for the Imperial Guard. These uniforms were based on those of officers in the British Army.

1888 designs 
On September 24, 1888, a conference was held within the Ministry of the Imperial Household regarding uniforms for employees within the palace. The attendees were Minister of the Imperial Household Hijikata Hisamoto, head of the Board of Ceremonies Nabeshima Naohiro, Master of the Palace Table , Master of the Empress's Palace , the director of the Bureau of Imperial Mews at the time (name unknown), and the foreign advisor Ottmar von Mohl.

As a result, in the winter of that year, high officials involved in supply management to the palace and hunting were assigned their own uniforms, as were various positions in the Bureau of Imperial Mews. Servants and coachmen were also assigned formal and informal court wear, as well as regular uniforms.

1911 designs 

On May 26, 1911, the Imperial Household Ordinance on Imperial Household Agency Uniforms abolished the 1884 and 1891 uniforms and unified the regulations.

An earlier proposal, dated to May 9 of the same year, also included changes to the uniforms of low-ranking employees like Imperial Guard patrolmen, but the released ordinance delegated responsibility for the uniforms of Imperial Household Agency employees at or below  level to the Imperial Household Agency itself. The Imperial Household Agency released ordinances defining the uniforms for these employees the next day, on May 27.

1928 designs 

The Ordinance on Imperial Household Agency Uniforms was modified on March 16, 1928. The uniforms for high officials outside the Bureau of Imperial Mews were changed from gowns to tailcoats, and their stand-up collars changed to a type that closed all the way to the top.

Notes

References

Bibliography

Related laws 
 Imperial Household Ordinance No. 22 of 1910. 
 Imperial Household Ordinance No. 5 of 1911. 
 Imperial Ordinance No. 15 of 1908. 
 Imperial Ordinance No. 311 of 1926. 

Court uniforms and dress
Japanese clothing
Material culture of royal courts